Jalan Belimbing (Pahang state route C19) is a major road in Pahang, Malaysia. It is also a main route to Lake Chini.

List of junctions

Roads in Pahang